"Clown Song" (styled as "Clown-Song") is the debut and only single by Danish artist, P-Control. The song was released in 2002 and peaked at number 8 in Denmark and 43 in Australia.

Track listings
 Danish single
 "Clown Song" (Radio "Censored" mix) - 3:38
 "Clown Song" (Electronic Radio mix) - 3:00
 "Clown Song" (M. F. Radio edit) - 3:38
 "Clown Song" (Club "Censored") - 5:08
 "Clown Song" (Mother F.... Club mix) - 5:10
 "Clown Song" (Electronic remix) - 4:55

 Australian single
 "Clown Song" (Video Mix) - 3:39	
 "Clown Song" (Sunburner Remix [Edit]) - 3:46	
 "Clown Song" (Sunburner Remix) - 7:51	
 "Clown Song" (Electronic Remix) - 4:55

Charts

References

2002 singles
2002 songs